Green Energy (UK) Ltd, also known as GEUK®, is an independent sustainable energy company which sells 100% Ofgem-certified green and renewable electricity and gas, to homes, businesses and organisations in England, Wales and Scotland. GEUK is the only energy supplier in the UK to offer 100% green gas. Based in Ware, Hertfordshire, GEUK was established in 2001 by chief executive officer Douglas Stewart.

GEUK is not to be confused with Green Network Energy, a separate utility company that ceased trading in January 2021, or Green Supplier Limited, which ceased trading in September 2021.

About

GEUK were the first energy supplier to provide only 100% green gas to domestic and business customers. To this day they are still the only supplier who provide 100% green gas to domestic customers.

They were the first and only private company in the UK to give free shares to its customers. Whilst this scheme has now ended, some customers remain shareholders, and can make suggestions at any time to improve the business and help it grow, and they can attend its AGM and put questions to the board.

Green Energy UK's customer base has grown through customer recommendation, sponsorship and social-marketing activities.

Fuel mix

GEUK was the first UK energy supplier to offer a choice of green-only tariffs including 100% green gas. All their tariffs are made up of 100% green sources – solar, wind, hydro and biomass and biomethane (green gas). 

The EKO Energy Tariff offered by GEUK is independently certified by EKOenergy a global, nonprofit ecolabel for renewable energy. The ecolabel proves that the consumed energy fulfills extra sustainability and quality criteria, set by a network of environmental NGOs. Using the ecolabel also helps consumers make a concrete and additional impact through our Climate Fund and Environmental Fund.

GEUK launched the UK's first time-of-use tariff, TIDE in January 2017. Tide encourages customers to vary usage and consume electricity in periods of lower demand when the price is cheaper using an electricity smart meter.

Generators
Only a few of GEUK's 650 generators were making electricity before GEUK was set up. The company's generators are all approved by Ofgem and have a large range of sources including energy from waste, biomass, photovoltaic-solar, small-scale hydro, wind, CHP and anaerobic digestion.

The company only buys green-sourced electricity and gas from within the UK and has no brown energy or nuclear in its business. GEUK facilitates investment into renewable technologies by creating demand for this green energy.

Awards
GEUK were awarded the Which? Eco Provider badge, 2021 

GEUK was ranked No.1 'Best Buy' by Ethical Consumer Magazine, 2021

GEUK was crowned 'Winner of Winners' in the Cisco Customer Kings competition, 2010.

References

External links
 
 Green Energy UK Crowned Customer Kings, Winner of Winners 2010

Electric power companies of the United Kingdom
Renewable energy companies of the United Kingdom
Energy companies established in 2001
Renewable resource companies established in 2001
British companies established in 2001
Companies based in East Hertfordshire District
2001 establishments in England